Miss International 1978, the 18th Miss International pageant, was held on November 10, 1978 at the Mielparque in Tokyo, Japan. Katherine Ruth earned United States's second Miss International crown.

Results

Placements

Contestants

  - Graciela Riadigos
  - Michelle Cay Adamson
  - Elisabeth Havichek
  - Brigitte Maria Antonia Muyshondt
  - Rosita de Lourdes Requeña
  - Ângela Soares Chichierchio
  - Patricia Morgan
  - Kimberly Ann Allan
  - Marianela Verónica Toledo Rojas
  - Olga Lucia Prada Rodríguez
  - Marlene Lourdes Amador Barrenechea
  - Anita Heske
  - Hymy Marja Suuronen
  - Véronique Fagot
  - Petra Brinkmann
  - Aspasia "Sia" Krokidou
  - Carmen Blas Sablan
  - Roxane Celeste Fleming
  - Karin Ingrid Gustaffson
  - Lorena Irias Navas
  - Regina Tsang Hing-Yu
  - Sigurlaug "Dilly" Halldórsdóttir
  - Sabita Dhanrajgir
  - Lorraine Bernadette Enriquez
  - Lea Avgi
  - Gloria Aita
  - Atsuko Taguchi
  - Chae Jung-sook
  - Farida Abdul Samad
  - Olga Pescador Sosa
  - Patricia Lorazo
  - Donella Elizabeth Clemmence Thomsen
  - Maria Auxiliadora Paguaga Mantilla
  - Jeanette Aarum
  - Luz de la Cruz Policarpio
  - Felina Teo Bee Wah
  - Maria Inmaculada Arencibia Parrado
  - Pia Birgitta Eriksson
  - Daniela Patricia Haberli
  - Zulal Zeynen Mazmanoglu
  - Sara Alaga Valega
  - Katherine Ruth
  - Doris Fueyo Moreno

Replacements
  - Sarah Louise Long

References 

1978
1978 in Tokyo
1978 beauty pageants
Beauty pageants in Japan